NVSS may refer to:

 National Vital Statistics System, a U.S. government vital statistics system
 NRAO VLA Sky Survey, an astronomical survey of the northern hemisphere
 NVSS designation, names like NVSS 2146+82 for objects catalogued by the survey
 North View Secondary School, a former school in Yishun, Singapore
 North Vista Secondary School, a school in Sengkang, Singapore
 N. V. S. S. Prabhakar, a politician from Telangana, India
 Santo-Pekoa International Airport, ICAO code NVSS
 Nechako Valley Secondary School, in School District 91 Nechako Lakes in Canada